The 2014 Colorado State Rams football team represented Colorado State University in the 2014 NCAA Division I FBS football season. The Rams were led by third-year head coach Jim McElwain and played their home games at Sonny Lubick Field at Hughes Stadium. They were members of the Mountain Division of the Mountain West Conference. They finished the season 10–3, 6–2 in Mountain West play to finish in a tie for second place in the Mountain Division. They were invited to the Las Vegas Bowl where they lost to Utah 45–10.

At the end of the regular season, McElwain resigned to take the same position at Florida. Offensive coordinator Dave Baldwin was the interim head coach for the Las Vegas Bowl.

Schedule

Rankings

Game summaries

vs Colorado

at Boise State

UC Davis

at Boston College

Tulsa

at Nevada

Utah State

Wyoming

at San Jose State

Hawaii

New Mexico

at Air Force

Utah–Las Vegas Bowl

Players in the 2015 NFL Draft

References

Colorado State
Colorado State Rams football seasons
Colorado State Rams football